Adrian School District is a school district headquartered in Adrian, Oregon. The district is entirely in Malheur County.

History
In 1978 the district had 378 students. In 1978 plaintiffs filed a petition to recall three members of the school board.

In August 2021, during the COVID-19 pandemic in Oregon, superintendent Kevin Purnell stated that he would enforce the state's mask mandate in the district. That month the school board removed him from his position. The vote was four in favor of firing, one against. CNN asked the district for further explanation but the district did not respond.

Schools
 Adrian High School
 Adrian Elementary and Middle School

References

External links
 Adrian School District

School districts in Oregon
Education in Malheur County, Oregon